The Man in the Wall is a 2015 Israeli drama film, written and directed by Evgeny Ruman. The film is set entirely in a Tel Aviv apartment following a man's disappearance.

Plot

Young wife Shira is awakened one Friday night from a nap by a neighbor, complaining that her dog was alone outside their apartment building. He had been taken for a walk by her husband, Rami, who has disappeared. The police refuse to act until Rami has been missing 24 hours, leaving Shira alone to worry. As more and more visitors arrive to talk with and console Shira, surprising new details emerge about her husband and their relationship.

Cast
Tamar Alkan as Shir, masseuse and Rami's wife
Gilad Kahana as Rami, sound engineer and Shir's husband
Ruth Rasiuk as Adi, Shir's friend and Rami's ex-girlfriend
Alit Kreiz as Shir's mother
Tom Antopolsky as Ella, Rami's silly drug dealer
Shlomi Avraham as Young Policeman
Amitay Yaish Benuosilio as Policeman
Roi Miller as Nadav, Adi's boyfriend
Yoav Donat as Dudi, Rami's friend
Eli Gorenstein as Doron, Rami's father
Rodia Kozlovski as Tommy, Shir's boyfriend
Ze'ev Shimshoni as neighbor

References

External links

2015 thriller drama films
Films set in Tel Aviv
Israeli thriller drama films
2010s Hebrew-language films
2015 films
2015 drama films